Mogens Holm (born 10 February 1941) is a Danish rower. He competed in the men's coxed four event at the 1972 Summer Olympics.

References

1941 births
Living people
Danish male rowers
Olympic rowers of Denmark
Rowers at the 1972 Summer Olympics
Place of birth missing (living people)